The Des Moines Boosters were a Western League minor league baseball team based in Des Moines, Iowa, United States that existed from 1908 to 1924. Des Moines fielded teams in the Western League from 1900-1937 and 1947–1958.

Hall of Famers George Davis and Red Faber played for the Des Moines Boosters.

History

The Des Moines Boosters won two Western League championships - their first in 1915 under manager Frank Isbell and their second in 1917 under Jack Coffey.

Des Moines had first fielded a Western League team in 1900,  playing under several monikers before being called the "Boosters." At the time, the league was a Class A league, the highest level of minor league play. The teams that directly preceded the Des Moines Boosters in Western League play were the Des Moines Hawkeyes (1900–1901), Des Moines Midgets (1902), Des Moines Undertakers (1903),  Des Moines Prohibitionists (1904), Des Moines Underwriters (1905), Des Moines Champions (1906) and Des Moines Champs (1907) before becoming the Des Moines Boosters (1908–1924). Des Moines won Western league Championships in 1905 and 1906, leading to the championship reference monikers.

The Des Moines Demons continued play the Western League, playing in the league from 1925–1937. The Western League did not play in 1938, but resumed in 1938 without a Des Moines franchise.

The Des Moines Bruins rejoined the Western League in 1947. The Des Moines Bruins remained in the Western League until it folded in 1958.

The ballparks 

From 1912–1924 the Des Moines Boosters played home games at Western League Park, also known as Holcomb Avenue Park or just Holcomb Park. The ballpark had a maximum capacity of 12,000 (1930). It was on the northwest corner of Holcomb Avenue (south, home plate) and Seventh Street (east, right field), near the Des Moines River (west, left field).

The park opened on April 14, 1912, with the Boosters defeating Ottumwa 10-3.[Des Moines Register, April 15, 1912, p.6]

On  May 2, 1930, Western League Park and the Des Moines Demons hosted the first night game played under permanent light standards. The ballgame was partially broadcast nationally on NBC. 

Today, the site contains Des Moines North High School's Grubb Community Stadium. Seventh Street no longer cuts through the area. The high school stadium is on the northwest corner of Holcomb Avenue and Sixth Street.

Prior to Western League Park, the Des Moines clubs played at these locations, as listed in contemporary city directories:
1887–1897 Athletic Park, south of West Elm Street and west of South Seventh Street, also given as "foot of Seventh Street"
1900–1908 West of Fourth Street between Grand Avenue and Chestnut Street, west side of river
1909–1911 Northeast corner of East Walnut Street and 20th Street, east side of river

Notable alumni

Baseball Hall of Fame alumni
George Davis
Red Faber

Notable alumni
Mack Allison
Goat Anderson
Art Bader
Ira Belden
Joe Benz
Ping Bodie
Eli Cates
Felix Chouinard
George Clark
Jack Coffey
Guy Cooper
Red Corriden
Nick Cullop
Jack Dalton
Charlie Dexter
Joe Dolan
Phil Douglas
Bernie Duffy
Bill Fetzer
Ray Flaskamper
Gene Ford
Ray French
Jack Gilligan
Peaches Graham
Jack Graney
Jim Grant
Ed Hahn
Raymond Haley
Bruce Hartford
Ziggy Hasbrook
Irv Higginbotham
Shags Horan
Bernie Hungling
Bill Hunter
Frank Isbell
Tex Jones
Red Kelly
Ed Kinsella
Joe Klugmann
Cliff Knox
Art Kores
Frank Lange
Joe Leonard
Willie Ludolph
Del Mason
Wally Mattick
Red McDermott
Polly McLarry
Frank McManus
Paul Meloan
Billy Meyer
Horace Milan
Frank Miller
Danny Moeller
George Mogridge
Buzz Murphy
Paul Musser
Andy Nelson
Bert Niehoff
Lefty O'Doul
Fred Olmstead
Harry Patton
George Payne
Herman Pillette
Tom Reilly
Clint Rogge
Carl Sawyer
Frank Schneiberg
Paul Sentell
Al Shaw
Camp Skinner
Phil Slattery
Claude Thomas
Art Thomason
Bert Whaling
Earl Whitehill
Clyde Williams
Mutt Williams
Mike Wilson
George Winn
Roy Witherup
George Yeager
Moses J. Yellow Horse

External links
Sanborn map showing Holcomb ballpark, 1951
Sanborn map showing Des Moines ballpark, 1901

References

Baseball teams established in 1908
Defunct minor league baseball teams
Sports in Des Moines, Iowa
Defunct baseball teams in Iowa
1908 establishments in Iowa
Baseball teams disestablished in 1924
1924 disestablishments in Iowa
Defunct Western League teams
Des Moines Boosters players